William Frye may refer to:
William P. Frye (1830–1911), American politician from Maine
William Frye (painter) (1822–1872), German-born American painter
William Frye (producer) (1921–2017), American producer
William F. Frye (1929–1988), American attorney and politician from Oregon
William Frye (MP) (died 1427), English politician
William P. Frye (1901), a sailing ship

See also
Sen. William P. Frye House, a historic home in Lewiston, Maine
William Fry (disambiguation)